Mykhaylo Berezovyi (born January 1, 1994) is a Ukrainian footballer who plays as a midfielder.

Playing career 
Berezovyi played in the Ukrainian Second League with FC Skala Stryi in 2014. In 2016, he played in the Ukrainian Amateur League with FC Sambir, and later returned to Skala. He played abroad in 2018 with CSC Mississauga in the Canadian Soccer League. In the off season he played indoor soccer with Ukraine AC in the Arena Premier League. In 2020, CSC Mississauga loaned Berezovyi to FC Vorkuta for the 2020 season.

References 
 

1994 births
Living people
Ukrainian footballers
FC Skala Stryi (2004) players
FC Sambir players
Toronto Atomic FC players
FC Continentals players 
Canadian Soccer League (1998–present) players
Association football midfielders
Ukrainian Second League players